John Carlyle Kenley (26 February 1892 – 23 July 1965) was an Australian rules footballer who played with Melbourne and St Kilda in the Victorian Football League (VFL).

Notes

External links 

 

1892 births
1965 deaths
Australian rules footballers from Melbourne
Melbourne Football Club players
St Kilda Football Club players
People from Caulfield, Victoria